Saint-Siméon is a municipality in the Charlevoix-Est Regional County Municipality of Quebec, Canada. Founded in 1869, it was named after Saint Simeon of Jerusalem.

Its population centres include Saint-Siméon, Baie-des-Rochers, Port-au-Persil, and Port-aux-Quilles, all located along Route 138.

History 
The municipality was formed as a parish municipality in 1869 when it was separated from Saint-Fidèle-de-Mont-Murray (now part of La Malbaie). Its post office opened in 1882. In 1911, the main village was separated from the parish municipality and incorporated as the Village Municipality of Saint-Siméon. In 2001, the two municipal entities were rejoined as the new Municipality of Saint-Siméon.

Demographics

Population
Population trend:
 Population in 2011: 1300 (2006 to 2011 population change: -4.4%)
 Population in 2006: 1360
 Population total in 2001: 1452
 Saint-Siméon (parish): 468
 Saint-Siméon (village): 984
 Population in 1996:
 Saint-Siméon (parish): 477
 Saint-Siméon (village): 1012
 Population in 1991:
 Saint-Siméon (parish): 519
 Saint-Siméon (village): 1020

Private dwellings occupied by usual residents: 551 (total dwellings: 702)

Language
Mother tongue:
 English as first language: 0%
 French as first language: 100%
 English and French as first language: 0%
 Other as first language: 0%

See also
List of municipalities in Quebec

References

External links

Designated places in Quebec
Municipalities in Quebec
Incorporated places in Capitale-Nationale